David of Strathbogie (c. 1309 – 30 November 1335) was a 14th-century Anglo-Scottish noble. He was born the son and heir of Sir David II Strathbogie, Earl of Atholl, Constable of Scotland (who had been banished by Robert the Bruce) and Chief Warden of Northumberland, by his spouse Joan, elder daughter of Sir John Comyn of Badenoch, Joint Guardian of Scotland.

This David of Strathbogie was summoned to the English parliament from 25 January 1330 to 24 July 1334, by Writs directed to David de Strabolgi comiti Athol. In 1330 the English Crown conferred upon him the castle and manor of Odogh, in Ireland, which had belonged to his great-uncle, Aymer de Valence, Earl of Pembroke.

In 1332 he accompanied Edward Balliol into Scotland and was at the victory over Scottish forces at the battle of Dupplin Moor, 12 August 1332, following which Balliol restored to him his title and estates in Scotland. He rebelled in 1334, but was pardoned at the treaty of peace in 1335.

He was killed fighting Sir Andrew Murray at the Battle of Culblean (or Kilblane), in a serious setback for Balliol's forces.

He married Katherine, daughter of Henry de Beaumont, titular Earl of Buchan, by Alice, elder daughter and co-heiress of Sir Alexander Comyn. Katherine's dowry included parts of the manor of Ponteland, Little Eland, and Calverdon in Northumberland. As a widow, she appealed to the King to retrieve her portion from the Strabolgi estate. They had one son, and a probable daughter Isabel, wife of Sir Edmund de Cornwall, Knt.

He was succeeded by his son and heir, David IV Strathbogie.

Notes

References
Richardson, Douglas, Plantagenet Ancestry, Baltimore, Md., 2004: 50–1, 

1309 births
1335 deaths
David III
Earls or mormaers of Buchan
14th-century Scottish earls